FM- and TV-mast Ryki is a 213 metre tall guyed mast used FM- and TV-transmission at Ryki, Lublin Voivodeship in  Poland.

Transmitted Programmes

Digital TV (MPEG-4) Programmes

FM-Radio Programmes

See also
 List of masts

Buildings and structures in Lublin Voivodeship
2000 establishments in Poland
Towers completed in 2000